Town Hill is a mountain range in the U.S. states of Maryland and Pennsylvania.

Town Hill may also refer to:

 Town Hill, Bermuda, the highest point on the island of Bermuda
 Town Hill (Massachusetts), a mountain in Barnstable County, Massachusetts, U.S.
 Town Hill District, a historic district in Boston, Massachusetts, U.S.

See also
 Townhill (disambiguation)
 Hill town, a town built upon hills
 Hilltown (disambiguation)